Corinnaeturris angularis is a species of sea snail, a marine gastropod mollusk in the family Clathurellidae.

Distribution
This marine species occurs off Southeast Brazil

References

External links
 Figueira, R. M. A.; Absalão, R. S. (2010). Deep-water Mangeliinae, Taraninae and Clathurellinae (Mollusca: Gastropoda: Conoidea: Turridae) from the Campos Basin, southeast Brazil. Scientia Marina. 74(4): 731-743 page(s): 739

angularis
Molluscs of the Atlantic Ocean
Gastropods described in 2010